The 1976–77 Cincinnati Bearcats men's basketball team represented the University of Cincinnati in the 1976-77 NCAA Division I men's basketball season. The Bearcats were led by head coach Gale Catlett, as members of the Metro Conference. They finished the season 25–5, 4–2 in Metro play, finishing in second place. They defeated St. Louis, Memphis State, and Georgia Tech to win the Metro tournament for the second consecutive year, and received the conference's automatic bid to the NCAA tournament. They lost 66–51 to national champions Marquette.

Previous season 
The Bearcats finished the 1975–76 season 25–6, 2–1 in Metro play to win the regular season championship. As the number 1 seer, they defeated Georgia Tech and Memphis State to win the Metro tournament and received the conference's automatic bid to the NCAA tournament. They lost 79–78 to Notre Dame in the first round of the Midwest region.

Roster

Schedule and results

|-
!colspan=12 style=|Regular Season
|-

|-
!colspan=12 style=|Metro Conference tournament
|-

|-
!colspan=12 style=|NCAA Tournament
|-

Rankings

References

Cincinnati Bearcats men's basketball seasons
Cincinnati Bearcats men's basketball
Cincinnati
Cincinnati Bearcats men's basketball
Cincinnati